"Look at Us Now" is a song by American DJs Lost Kings, featuring singer Ally Brooke and rapper ASAP Ferg. The song is Brooke's first solo single outside Fifth Harmony. "Look at Us Now" was remixed by Kaidro.

Background 
The official lyric video was released on June 9, 2017. The song was described as a "summer jam, featuring sun-kissed guitar strumming, warm bass pads and bright '80s synths."

Charts

Release history

References 

2017 songs
2017 singles
American electronic dance music songs
Disruptor Records singles
Ally Brooke songs
ASAP Ferg songs
Songs written by ASAP Ferg
Songs written by Leroy Clampitt